Carolyn Lewis Attneave (July 2, 1920 – June 22, 1992) was born in El Paso, Texas, to Scandinavian and Delaware Native American parents. Attneave spent most of her early years in South Texas, but frequently spent summers with her Delaware relatives in Oklahoma. Her culturally aware upbringing would go on to influence her decision to research diversity. Attneave earned a bachelor's in English and Theatre at Chico State College in California in 1940. She would stay at Chico state College to earn another bachelor's in secondary education. After spending six years as a school teacher, she earned both her master's and doctorate in clinical psychology from Stanford University in 1947 and 1952, respectively.

Career and research
Attneave was the first Native American woman who earned her Ph.D. in psychology and is arguably the most "well-known psychologist of American-Indian background." In 1962, Attneave relocated to Oklahoma to work for the Oklahoma State Department of Health, where she worked to provide mental health services to seven Native American tribes in the area. This work would go on to influence her later efforts to provide Native American-specific mental health treatment. In 1968, she moved to Philadelphia, Pennsylvania, to work at the Child Guidance Clinic. It was here that she began to focus on network therapy, an alternative to the hospitalization in which the clients focus on their personal networks that may include their families and neighborhood communities. In an attempt to gain a better cultural understanding of the cultural contexts of her clients, she relocated to a primarily black area of Philadelphia, where she was able to understand different therapy networks. In 1973, her book Family Networks, written with Ross Speck, was published. Later, she moved to Boston, Massachusetts, where she was a founding member of the Boston Indian Council which held the title as the largest Indian council in the country. In 1970, Attneave founded, wrote, and edited the Network of Indian Psychologist that facilitated cultural resources for Indian communities. The Network of Indian Psychologist newsletter eventually grew into what is now known as the Society of Indian Psychologists. Beginning in 1973, she began her teaching career at Harvard University's School of Public Health and later joined the faculty at the University of Washington, where she directed the University's American Indian Studies Program. Attneave retired in 1980 where she continued to write, lecture, and travel until her death in 1992.

Tributes
The Carolyn Attneave Diversity Award, given out annually by the American Psychological Association, is named after her and recognizes "the promotion of diversity in family psychology."

In 2019 Stanford University’s Serra House where the Clayman Institute for Gender Research is located was renamed the Carolyn Lewis Attneave House. It was formerly named after Junípero Serra.

References

American women psychologists
20th-century American psychologists
People from El Paso, Texas
California State University, Chico alumni
Stanford University School of Humanities and Sciences alumni
1920 births
1992 deaths
20th-century American women
American people of Native American descent